Jessee/Miller Field is a sports stadium located on the campus of Trinity College in Hartford, Connecticut. It is the home field of the Trinity Bantams football team and the school's men's lacrosse team. The facility has a 400-meter track and a stadium seating capacity of 5,500. Named after Trinity's head football coaches Dan Jessee and Don Miller, it is the tenth-oldest college football field in United States. In recent years the field has also been affectionately referred to as The Coop, in reference to Trinity's mascot, the Bantam.

The first game was played on September 13, 1900. The stadium had no name until November 5, 1966, when it was christened as Jessee Field for the retiring Jessee during his final season as head football coach. Jessee was the head football coach at Trinity from 1932 to 1966, compiling a record of 150–76–7. The stadium was renamed Jessee/Miller Field on November 13, 1999 to honor Jessee's successor, Miller. Miller retired in 1998 as the all-time winningest coach in NCAA Division III football history in New England, compiling a record of 174–77–5 in 32 seasons as head coach of the Bantams.

References

College football venues
College lacrosse venues in the United States
Trinity Bantams football
Sports venues in Hartford County, Connecticut
Sports venues in Hartford, Connecticut
American football venues in Connecticut
Lacrosse venues in Connecticut